The  is a railway line in Aomori Prefecture, Japan, connecting  in the city of Goshogawara and  in the town of Nakadomari, in central-southern Tsugaru Peninsula. The Tsugaru Railway Line is notable for its seasonal trains that are run during the summer, autumn and winter. The Tsugaru Railway Line should not be confused with the former government Tsugaru Line, now operated by JR East.

Operation
The Tsugaru Railway Line is single-track for its entire length, and its sole passing loop is located at Kanagi Station.

All train services on the line are officially classified by the company as Local services, and most trains stop at all stations; however, some trains are timetabled to skip several stations. Historically, such trains were classified separately as Semi-Express services, and are referred to as such in the station list below.

During the summer (from 1 July to 31 August), locally-made wind chimes and haiku strips are hung from the ceiling of all trains in operation. These are replaced with baskets of Suzumushi during the autumn (1 September to mid-October).

Stove train
During the winter (from 1 December until 31 March the following year), a 'stove train' is generally operated three times per day. The 'stove train' features a traditional passenger car heated using a potbelly stove. A supplementary 'stove train' ticket, which costs ¥500, is required to board the 'stove train'. 'Stove trains' follow the Semi-Express stopping pattern.

Station list

History
The Tsugaru Railway Company was founded in 1928, and the first section of the line was opened on July 15, 1930 from Goshogawara to Kanagi. This was extended to Ōzawanai by October 4, 1930, and to its present terminus of Tsugaru-Nakasato by November 13, 1930. All freight operations were discontinued on February 1, 1984.

Former connecting lines
 Kanagi station - The Tsugaru Forest Railway, utilising a Shay locomotive and consisting of a 67 km main line (including two tunnels) and four branches between 2 and 8 km in length, operated between 1906 and 1970.

See also
List of railway companies in Japan
List of railway lines in Japan

References
This article incorporates material from the corresponding article in the Japanese Wikipedia.

External links 

  

Railway lines in Japan
Rail transport in Aomori Prefecture

1067 mm gauge railways in Japan
Railway lines opened in 1930